Ma'anshan East railway station is a railway station in Huashan District, Ma'anshan, Anhui, China. It is an intermediate station on the Nanjing–Anqing intercity railway. It opened in 2015.

References 

Railway stations in Anhui
Railway stations in China opened in 2015